Allan Francisco Segura Medina (born December 23, 1980) is a Costa Rican race walker. He represented Costa Rica at the 2008 Summer Olympics in Beijing, where he became the nation's flag bearer at the opening ceremony. He competed in the men's 20 km race walk, where he finished only in thirty-ninth place, with a time of 1:27:10. Segura also achieved his best result in race walking, when he finished thirty-second at the 2008 IAAF World Race Walking Cup in Cheboksary, Russia, with the fastest possible time of 1:23:12.

Personal bests

Track walk
20,000 m: 1:25:06.83 hrs –  San José, 26 June 2011

Road walk
20 km: 1:23:12 hrs –  Cheboksary, 10 May 2008
50 km: 4:25:15 hrs –  Chihuahua, 22 February 2014

Achievements

References

External links
Profile – CON-CRC 
NBC Olympics Profile

1980 births
Living people
People from San José Province
Costa Rican male racewalkers
Olympic athletes of Costa Rica
Athletes (track and field) at the 2008 Summer Olympics
Pan American Games competitors for Costa Rica
Athletes (track and field) at the 2007 Pan American Games
Athletes (track and field) at the 2011 Pan American Games
Central American Games gold medalists for Costa Rica
Central American Games medalists in athletics
Central American Games bronze medalists for Costa Rica